Robert Hazard (né Rimato, August 21, 1948 – August 5, 2008) was an American musician.  He wrote, composed, and recorded the song "Girls Just Want to Have Fun" in 1979, which was covered in 1983 by Cyndi Lauper, who turned it into a best-selling hit. He also composed the new-wave and MTV songs "Escalator of Life" and "Change Reaction", which he performed with his band, Robert Hazard and the Heroes, that was popular in the Philadelphia club scene during the 1980s. These songs appeared on the five song EP Robert Hazard, released in June 1982 by his own record label "RHA Records", and the next November by major label RCA Records.  RCA released his first LP album, Wing of Fire, in January 1984.

Biography

Early life and studies
Robert Hazard was born in August 21, 1948 in Philadelphia, Pennsylvania, the son of an opera singer. He grew up in Springfield Township, Pennsylvania and graduated from Springfield High School in 1966.

Music career and genres developed
Kurt Loder profiled him in a 1981 Rolling Stone article, describing Hazard as a musician "...who started out as a Dylan-era folkie, then spent eight years singing country & western. 'I just love country music', he explains, which of course explains nothing, least of all the two years he subsequently spent with a reggae band... or his current electro-pop approach, which owes little to any of the above."

Last albums made of country music
His final recordings were country albums, beginning with The Seventh Lake (2003) and continuing with Blue Mountain (2004). In 2007, Rykodisc signed Hazard and released his album, Troubadour.

Death
Hazard died 16 days before his 60th birthday at Massachusetts General Hospital in Boston on August 5, 2008 following surgery for pancreatic cancer with which he had recently been diagnosed.

Discography

Studio albums
Wing of Fire (1984)
Darling (1986)
Howl (1998)
The Seventh Lake (2004)
Blue Mountain (2004)
Troubadour (2007)

Extended plays

 Robert Hazard (1982) – No. 102 (Billboard 200)

Compilation albums
 Out of the Blue (as Robert Hazard and the Heroes) (2005)

Singles

 "Escalator of Life" (1982) – No. 58 (Billboard Top 100)
 "Change Reaction" (1982) – No. 106 (Bubbling Under Hot 100)
 "Hard Hearted" (1984)

References

External links

 Robert Hazard and the Heroes homepage at phillyrockers.com
 Robert Hazard and the Heroes history page at phillyrockers.com
 Robert Hazard Biography at phillyrockers.com (archived)
 Robert Hazard on MySpace
  by students of The Paul Green School of Rock Music, with Robert Hazard singing
 Robert Hazard (obituary) in The Independent

Deaths from cancer in Massachusetts
Deaths from pancreatic cancer
Musicians from Philadelphia
People from Springfield Township, Delaware County, Pennsylvania
RCA Records artists
Rykodisc artists
Songwriters from Pennsylvania
1948 births
2008 deaths
20th-century American musicians